Siege of Paris may refer to:
Siege of Paris (845), the Viking siege by Reginherus, possibly Ragnar Lodbrok
Siege of Paris (885–886), the Viking siege by Rollo
Siege of Paris (978), by Otto II of Germany
Siege of Paris (1429), by Charles VII of France and Joan of Arc
Siege of Paris (1465), by the League of the Public Weal
Siege of Paris (1590), the Protestant siege by Henry IV of France
Siege of Paris (1870–1871), the German siege in the Franco–Prussian War

See also

 Battle of Paris (disambiguation)